

Group A

All times EST

Group B

All times EST

2008 Group Stage